Bilal ( Bilāl) is both a given name and a surname of Arabic/African origin. Notable people with the name include:

Mononym

Bilal ibn Rabah al-Habashi (c. 580 – c. 640), companion of the Islamic prophet Muhammad
Bilal ibn al-Harith (? – died c. 682), one of the sahaba, companion of the Islamic prophet Muhammad
Cheb Bilal (born 1966) full name Bilal Mouffok, Algerian raï singer
Bilal (American singer) (born 1979), American R&B/jazz singer
Bilal (Lebanese singer) (born 1983), Lebanese gypsy singer
Bilal Mansoor Ali (born 1988), Kenyan-Bahraini distance runner

Given name
Bilal Abdullah, British doctor of Iraqi descent behind the 2007 Glasgow International Airport attack
Bilal Akgül (born 1982), Turkish Olympian mountain biker
Bilal Asad (born 1978), Pakistani cricketer
Bilal Aziz Özer, Lebanese-Turkish footballer
Bilal Baig (born 1995), Canadian writer and actor
Bilal Çubukçu (born 1987), Turkish footballer
Bilal Duckett (born 1989), American football (soccer) player
Bilal Fawaz (born c. 1988), UK-based Nigerian born boxer of Lebanese/Benin descent
Bilal Gülden (born 1993), Turkish footballer
Bilal Haider (born 1973), Pakistani cricketer
Bilal Hajji, lyricist, songwriter and record producer based in Sweden
Bilal Hassani (born 1999), French pop singer and YouTuber
Bilal Hussein, photojournalist
Bilal Khan (singer) (born 1986), Pakistani pop singer and songwriter
Bilal Khan (actor) (1978–2010), Pakistani television actor and model
Bilal Khazal, Lebanese Australian suspected member of Al-Qaeda
Bilal Kısa (born 1983), Turkish footballer
Bilal Lashari (born 1984), Pakistani film director and cinematographer 
Bilal Macit (born 1984), Turkish politician
Bilal Maqsood (born 1971), Pakistani pop artist and member of the Pakistani pop band Strings
Bilal Mohammed (born 1986), Qatari football player
Bilal Yusuf Mohammed (born 1983), French football player
Bilal Moumen, (born 1990), Algerian football player
Bilal Saad Mubarak (born 1972), Qatari shot putter
Bilal Najdi (born 1993), Lebanese football player
Bilal Najjarine (born 1981), Lebanese football player
Bilal Najjarin (rugby league), Australian rugby league player
Bilal Nazki (born 1947), Indian chief justice, Chairman of the Human Rights Commission of Bihar, India
Bilal Nichols (born 1996), American football player
Bilal Orfali, Lebanese scholar of Arabic language and literature
Bilal Ould-Chikh (born 1997), Dutch football player 
Bilal Philips (born 1947), speaker and author on Islam
Bilal Powell (born 1988), American football running back
Bilal Rafiq (born 1985), Pakistani footballer
Bilal Rifaat (born 1957), Egyptian fencer
Bilal Saeed (born 1988), Pakistani singer and songwriter 
Bilal Salaam, American singer and composer
Bilal Shafayat (born 1984), English cricketer
Bilal Sidibé (born 1978), Mauritanian football player
Bilal Skaf (born 1981), Australian convicted gang rapist
Bilal Wahib (born 1999), Dutch actor, singer and rapper
Bilal Xhaferri (1935–1986) Albanian poet, novelist, political dissident

Middle name 

Ahmed Bilal Osman, Sudanese politician

Surname/family name 

Asmar Bilal (born 1997), American football player
Badr Bilal (born 1962), Qatari football player
Charles Bilal, American administrator, mayor of Kountze, Texas
Enki Bilal (born 1951), French comic book creator, comics artist and film director
Malika Bilal, broadcast journalist
Mohamed Gharib Bilal (born 1945), nuclear scientist, Chief Minister of Zanzibar 
Muhammad Ibrahim Bilal, member of a terrorist group dubbed the Portland Seven
Muhsen Bilal (born 1944), Syrian surgeon, ambassador and politician
Muslim Belal (born 1982), British actor, screenwriter and spoken word performance poet
Wafaa Bilal (born 1966), Iraqi American artist

See also
Bilel

Arabic masculine given names
Turkish masculine given names
Arabic-language surnames
Pakistani masculine given names